Bonta is a surname. Notable people with the surname include:

Paula Bonta, Argentinian-Canadian computer scientist and educational software designer
Rob Bonta (born 1972), American politician
Vanna Bonta (1953–2014), Italian-American writer, actress, and inventor
Zoltán Bonta (born 1954), Hungarian filmmaker and videographer